A by-election was held for the New South Wales Legislative Assembly electorate of Yass Plains on 8 February 1866 because Robert Isaacs had been appointed Solicitor General in the second Martin ministry. Such ministerial by-elections were usually uncontested however on this occasion a poll was required in Patrick's Plains (Bowie Wilson) and Yass Plains. Both ministers were comfortably re-elected with more than 70% of the vote. The other ministers James Martin (The Lachlan), Henry Parkes (Kiama), James Byrnes (Parramatta) and Geoffrey Eagar (West Sydney) were re-elected unopposed.

Robert Ross campaigned for free trade and free selection before survey and had been unsuccessful in three previous elections, for Cumberland Boroughs in 1856, Windsor in 1859 and The Hastings in 1860. This was the final occasion on which he stood for parliament.

Dates

Result

Robert Isaacs was appointed Solicitor General in the second Martin ministry.

See also
 Electoral results for the district of Yass Plains
List of New South Wales state by-elections

References

1866 elections in Australia
New South Wales state by-elections
1860s in New South Wales